Stephen James "Steve" Warne (born 27 February 1984 in Sutton-in-Ashfield) is an English  footballer who played as a midfielder in the Football League for Chesterfield. He currently played for Handsworth Parramore and is now retired.

Career
Warne began his career as a trainee with Chesterfield in 2001. He made four first-team appearances in the 2002–03 campaign, and was given a professional contract in July 2003. Naturally right footed and operating mainly in the centre of midfield Warne has the ability to play across the midfield in a variety of positions and has been a regular and success at all the clubs he has played for.

Warne made his professional debut for Chesterfield in the football league trophy against Port Vale on 12 November 2002 and went on to make 3 more appearances that year against Barnsley, Swindon and Wigan. Due to changes in the management in following seasons Warne was struggling to find opportunities for playing time and after spells on loan with Worksop Town and Matlock Town, he was released by Chesterfield at the end of the 2003–04 season and joined Conference North club Hucknall Town.

Released two months later, he signed for Matlock Town for the second time. In October 2007, Warne moved on to Conference North side Alfreton Town, but failed to settle and returned to Matlock at the end of the season.

Warne eventually moved to Belper Town permanently in 2012 after being on loan with them for a brief spell in the 2011 season and helped the club to promotion to the Northern Premier League in the 2013–14 season through the play-offs. He joined Handsworth Parramore in July 2015.

References

External links
 

1984 births
Living people
Sportspeople from Sutton-in-Ashfield
Footballers from Nottinghamshire
English footballers
Association football midfielders
Chesterfield F.C. players
Worksop Town F.C. players
Matlock Town F.C. players
Hucknall Town F.C. players
Alfreton Town F.C. players
English Football League players
Belper Town F.C. players
Handsworth F.C. players
Northern Premier League players